Sandage is a surname. Notable people with the surname include:

Allan Sandage (1926–2010), American astronomer
Scott Sandage, American cultural historian

Americanized surnames
Surnames of Polish origin